, the State of New Jersey recognizes and licenses 66 institutions of higher education (post-secondary) through its Commission on Higher Education. These institutions include four public research universities, seven state colleges and universities, fourteen private colleges and universities (two of which are classified as research universities), eighteen county colleges, fourteen religious institutions, and eight for-profit proprietary schools.

As of July 2020, The U.S. Department of Education listed 166 colleges and universities in its database. This includes technical and vocational schools that offer only certificates or job training as well as degree-granting colleges and universities.

New Jersey was the only British colony to permit the establishment of two colleges in the colonial period.  Princeton University, chartered in 1746 as the College of New Jersey, and Rutgers, The State University of New Jersey, chartered on November 10, 1766 as Queen's College, were two of nine colleges founded before the American Revolution. In the 1860s, these two colleges competed to become the state's land grant college under the terms of the Morrill Act of 1862 which provided land and funding to expand development of engineering, scientific, agricultural, and military education at one school in each state. Rutgers received the designation in 1864 began to expand instruction in these areas and taking on a hybrid private-public role that paved the way for its transformation into a state university in 1945. Today, Rutgers is a large public research university serving over 65,000 students. Princeton remained a private college and developed into a research university that is one of the nation's eight prestigious Ivy League schools.

On August 22, 2012, the New Jersey governor Chris Christie signed into law the New Jersey Medical and Health Science Education Restructuring Act which divided the University of Medicine and Dentistry of New Jersey (UMDNJ) between Rutgers and Rowan University, creating two public medical schools. According to The Star-Ledger, the law gave Rutgers "nearly all of UMDNJ—including its medical schools in Newark and Piscataway—in one of the greatest expansions in the state university's history" and southern New Jersey's Rowan University would "take over UMDNJ's osteopathic medical school in Stratford."

There are three law schools in the state accredited by the American Bar Association; two at Rutgers (at the university's Rutgers–Newark and Rutgers–Camden campuses respectively) and the other at Seton Hall Universitys campus in Newark.

Colleges and universities

Public colleges and universities

Private colleges and universities

County community colleges

New Jersey has a system of 18 public community colleges at the county level statewide. This reflects the fact that each college serves one of New Jersey's 21 counties, except for Atlantic Cape Community College, Rowan College of South Jersey, and Raritan Valley Community College, each of which serves two counties. In 1989, the New Jersey Council of County Colleges was created to promote the advancement of the state's county community colleges. In 2003, governor James McGreevey created the New Jersey Community Colleges Compact, through Executive Order No. 81, as a statewide partnership to enable cooperation between the colleges and various state departments. The county colleges of New Jersey represent 56% of all undergraduate students in the state and offer studies in associate degree and certificate programs. Reflecting long-term trends nationwide, the male-to-female ratio of students in the system is 41% male to 59% female, and 48% of students are over the age of 24. Overall, the system enrolls more than 350,000 students each year on campuses that range in size from 1,300 students at Salem Community College to over 15,000 students at Bergen Community College.

Not all of the county colleges were founded by the State of New Jersey; the oldest county college in New Jersey, Union County College, was founded in 1933 by the Federal Emergency Relief Administration as Union County Junior College; it operated as a private college from 1936 to 1982, and merged with the publicly operated Union County Technical Institute in 1982 to become the current public institution.

For-profit institutions

Independent religious schools

Religious colleges

Christian theological seminaries
Theological schools are typically classified as "Special Topic Institutions" by the Carnegie Foundation.

Talmudic schools

Defunct institutions

See also

 New Jersey County Colleges
 Higher education in New Jersey
 Higher education in the United States
 List of American institutions of higher education
 List of college athletic programs in New Jersey
 List of recognized higher education accreditation organizations
 List of colleges and universities
 List of colleges and universities by country
 New Jersey student loan program

References

Notes

Citations

External links
College & University Directory by Sector from New Jersey Commission on Higher Education

New Jersey
Universities and colleges